In this page we keep the names in Hungarian order (family name first).

A

 Alexits György (1899–1978)
 Arany Dániel

B

 Babai László (born 1950) Paul Erdős Prize
 Bárány Imre (born 1947) Paul Erdős Prize
 Beck József (born 1952) Paul Erdős Prize
 Bollobás Béla (born 1943) Senior Whitehead Prize  
 Bolyai Farkas (1775–1856)
 Bolyai János (1802–1860), spoke 10 languages, vital in the systematic equations behind Non-Euclidean Geometry
 Raoul Bott (1923–2005) Steele Prize
 Barabási Albert-László (born 1967)

C

 Császár Ákos (1924–2017)
 Csörgő Sándor (1947–2008) Paul Erdős Prize

D

 Daróczy Zoltán Paul Erdős Prize
 Dienes Zoltán Pál (1916–2014)

E

 Erdős Pál (1913–1996)

F

 Fejér Lipót (1880–1959)
 Fellegi Péter Iván (born 1935)

G

 Grossmann Marcell (1878–1936)
 Farkas Gyula (1847–1930)

H

 Haar Alfréd (1885–1933)
 Hajnal András (1931-2016)
 Hajós György (1912–1972)
 Halász Gábor (born 1941) Paul Erdős Prize
 Hatvani István (1718–1786)
 Hell Miksa (1720–1792), worked as an astronomer

I
 Izsák Imre (1929–1965), Hungarian mathematician

J

 Juhász István (born 1943) Paul Erdős Prize

K

 Kalmár László (1905–1976)
 Kármán Tódor (1881–1963)
 Katona Gyula O. H. (born 1941)
 Katona Gyula Y. (born 1965)
 Kemény János (1926–1992)
 Komjáth Péter (born 1953) Paul Erdős Prize
 Komlós János (born 1942)
 Kőnig Dénes (1884–1944)
 Kőnig Gyula (1849–1913)
 Kürschák József (1864–1933)

L

 Laczkovich Miklós (born 1948) Paul Erdős Prize
 Lánczos Kornél (1893–1974)
 Lax Péter (born 1926)
 Lovász László (born 1948) Paul Erdős Prize

M
 Major Péter (born 1947)
 Mérő László (born 1949)
 Mösch Lukács (1651–1701)
 Medgyessy Pál (1919–1977)

N

 Nagy Károly (1797–1868)
 Neumann János (John von Neumann) (1903–1957), pioneer of computing and game theory

O

 Obádovics J. Gyula
 Ottlik Géza (1912–1990)

P

 Páles Zsolt (born 1956)
 Pálfy Péter Pál (born 1955) Paul Erdős Prize
 Péter Rózsa (1905–1977)
 Petzval József (1807–1891)
 Pintz János, (born 1950) Paul Erdős Prize
 Pólya György (1887–1985)
 Pósa Lajos (born 1947)
 Prékopa András (1929–2016)
 Pyber László (born 1960)

R

 Radó Tibor (1895–1965)
 Rényi Alfréd (1921–1970)
 Riesz Frigyes (1880–1956)
 Riesz Marcel (1886–1969)
 Ruzsa Z. Imre (born 1953) Paul Erdős Prize

S

 Sajnovics János (1733–1785)
 Sárközy András (born 1941) Paul Erdős Prize
 Scholtz Ágoston (1844–1916)
 Segner János András (1704–1777)
 T. Sós Vera (born 1930)
  (1918–2006)
 Süli Endre (born 1956) Naylor Prize and Lectureship

Sz

 Szász Domokos
 Szász Gábor (1926–2015)
 Szegedy Balázs  Paul Erdős and Fulkerson Prizes
 Szegedy Márió (born 1960) Gödel Prize
 Szemerédi Endre (born 1940) Paul Erdős and Abel Prizes
 Szekeres György (1911–2005)
 Szőkefalvi-Nagy Béla (1913–1998)
 Szőkefalvi-Nagy Gyula
 Szőnyi Tamás (born 1957) Paul Erdős Prize
 Szüsz Peter (1924–2008)

T

 Tardos Éva (born 1957)
 Tardos Gábor (born 1964) Paul Erdős Prize
 Turán Pál (1910–1976)
 Tusnády Gábor Paul Erdős Prize

U
 Urbán János

V

 Vargha András (born 1949)

W

 Weszely Tibor

Hungarian mathematicians